Remus is the surname of:

George Remus (1874–1952), American lawyer and bootlegger
Jorge Matute Remus (1912–2002), Mexican engineer
Robert Remus (born 1948), ring name Sgt. Slaughter, American semi-retired professional wrestler
Romola Remus (1900–1987), American actress best known for being the first to play Dorothy Gale onscreen
Ute Remus (born 1941), German actress, radio reader, presenter, and editor, and a writer